Nikita Vyglazov (born October 28, 1985) is a Russian professional ice hockey forward who is currently an unrestricted free agent. He most recently played for HC Sochi of the Kontinental Hockey League (KHL).

Vyglazov made his Kontinental Hockey League (KHL) debut playing with Avangard Omsk during the inaugural 2008–09 KHL season.

References

External links

1985 births
Living people
Avangard Omsk players
Avtomobilist Yekaterinburg players
Metallurg Novokuznetsk players
People from Olenegorsk, Murmansk Oblast
SKA Saint Petersburg players
HC Sochi players
HC Vityaz players
Yermak Angarsk players
Zauralie Kurgan players
Russian ice hockey right wingers
Sportspeople from Murmansk Oblast